Dear Friends and Gentle Hearts  is the fifth studio album by Oakland punk band American Steel, released on Fat Wreck Chords on July 21, 2009. The title references a phrase found written on a scrap of paper found in Stephen Foster's pocket after his death.

The tracks, "Emergency House Party" and "Safe and Sound" were released as free downloads on the Fat Wreck Chords website.  The album is released on CD and Vinyl, and it comes with a download card insert.

Track listing
"Emergency House Party"
"Tear the Place Apart"
"Safe and Sound"
"Your Ass Ain't Laughing Now"
"The Blood Gets Everywhere"
"From Here To Hell"
"Dear Friends and Gentle Hearts"
"Lights Out"
"Bergamot"
"Where You Want To Be"
"Finally Alone"
"Meals & Entertainment

References

American Steel albums
Fat Wreck Chords albums
2009 albums